The Triton 21, also called the Pearson 21, is an American trailerable sailboat that was designed by Clark Scarborough as a racer-cruiser and first built in 1985.

The Triton 21 design was developed from the US Yachts US 21 in 1984, after Pearson Yachts bought the US Yachts line of boats, including the molds from Bayliner.

Production
The design was built by Pearson Yachts in the United States, starting in 1985, but production ended soon after as the design didn't fit Pearson's marketing and the Triton line of boats was quickly discontinued. The company went bankrupt in 1991.

Design
The US 21 is a recreational keelboat, built predominantly of fiberglass, with wood trim. It has a fractional sloop rig; a raked stem; an open, walk-through, reverse transom; a transom-hung rudder controlled by a tiller and a lifting keel. It displaces  and carries  of ballast.

The boat is normally fitted with a small  outboard motor for docking and maneuvering.

The design has sleeping accommodation for four people, with a double "V"-berth in the bow cabin and a two straight settee berths in the main cabin. The galley is located on the port side just aft of the bow cabin and is equipped with a sink. The head is located in the bow cabin on the port side under the "V"-berth.

See also
List of sailing boat types

References

Keelboats
1980s sailboat type designs
Sailing yachts 
Trailer sailers
Sailboat type designs by Clark Scarborough
Sailboat types built by Pearson Yachts